Naomi Foner ( Achs; born March 4, 1946) is an American screenwriter and director. She is the mother of actors Maggie and Jake Gyllenhaal.

Early life and education
Foner was born in Brooklyn, New York City, the daughter of doctors Ruth (née Silbowitz; 1920–1968) and Samuel Achs (1919–2014). Her parents were both of Jewish ancestry. Her aunt was Freda (Silbowitz) Hertz (1915–2013), a lawyer. She was raised in a family of "high-achieving New York Jews." Her Ashkenazi Jewish grandparents immigrated from Eastern Europe (Latvia and Poland).

She attended Barnard College in New York City, graduating with a BA degree in English. She later earned an MA degree in developmental psychology from Columbia University.

Career
She has written the screenplays for several feature films, including Running on Empty (for which she received an Academy Award nomination for Best Original Screenplay and won a Golden Globe Award for the same category), Losing Isaiah, and most recently Bee Season. She was the Naomi referenced in the line "...what about Naomi?" at the end of each Love of Chair segment of The Electric Company, where she was an associate producer for two seasons.

In 2013, she made her directorial debut with Very Good Girls, starring Dakota Fanning and Elizabeth Olsen, which premiered at the 2013 Sundance Film Festival before attaining online and theatrical distribution in the U.S. with Tribeca Film. She collaborated on a script for an American-Chinese co-production titled Moon Flower of Flying Tigers, which was to be co-produced by Ann An and Paula Wagner and based upon the book by Gao Demin.

Personal life
Naomi Foner's first husband was Eric Foner, a historian and Columbia University professor, whom she married in 1965 and divorced in 1977. Her second marriage, 1977–2009, was to film director Stephen Gyllenhaal. They have collaborated professionally and have two children together, actors Maggie Gyllenhaal (b. 1977) and Jake Gyllenhaal (b. 1980).

References

External links

1946 births
Living people
American people of Latvian-Jewish descent
American people of Polish-Jewish descent
Barnard College alumni
Teachers College, Columbia University alumni
Naomi
Jewish American writers
Television producers from New York City
Writers from New York City
American women screenwriters
Best Screenplay Golden Globe winners
American women film directors
Film directors from New York City
Screenwriters from New York (state)
American women television producers
Columbia Graduate School of Arts and Sciences alumni
21st-century American Jews
21st-century American women
American Ashkenazi Jews